Spijkerboor is the name of two villages in the Netherlands:

 Spijkerboor (North Holland)
 Spijkerboor (Drenthe)